Moore River National Park is a national park in the Wheatbelt region of Western Australia, 95 km north of Perth.  The Moore River runs through the park on its way to the Indian Ocean where the township of Guilderton is situated.

The park is situated west of the Brand Highway near Regans Ford and consists of mainly banksia heathland.  There are no facilities in the park.

See also
 List of protected areas of Western Australia

References 

National parks of Western Australia
Protected areas established in 1969
Shire of Gingin